The Nassau Christian Center is an Assemblies of God church in Princeton, New Jersey located at 26 Nassau Street.  It is housed in an historic church building built in 1868 that was once home to Princeton's Second Presbyterian Church, later known as St. Andrew's Presbyterian.  The Christian Center was founded in 1978 and leased, purchasing in 1980, the then empty building from Nassau Presbyterian Church, which had been formed by the merger of Second Presbyterian with First Presbyterian of Princeton in 1973.

Gallery

References

External links

 Official Church Website

Churches in Princeton, New Jersey
Former Presbyterian churches in the United States
Assemblies of God churches
Historic district contributing properties in Mercer County, New Jersey